Leif Erichsen (15 October 1888 – 4 March 1924) was a Norwegian sailor.

Erichsen competed in the 1920 Summer Olympics. He was a crew member of the Norwegian boat Marmi, which won the silver medal in the 6 metre class (1907 rating).

References

External links
profile

1888 births
1924 deaths
Norwegian male sailors (sport)
Sailors at the 1920 Summer Olympics – 6 Metre
Olympic sailors of Norway
Olympic silver medalists for Norway
Olympic medalists in sailing
Medalists at the 1920 Summer Olympics